A car crusher is an industrial device used to reduce the dimensions of derelict (depreciated) cars prior to transport for recycling. 

Car crushers are compactors and can be of several types: one is a "pancake", where a scrap automobile is flattened by a huge descending hydraulically powered plate, or a baling press type, with which the automobile is compressed from several directions until it resembles a large cube. A third type is a mobile crusher. It is small enough that it can be moved from location to location with a semi truck. This machine utilizes a much smaller plate that crushes the vehicle in sections, as it is slowly fed through the machine.

Types of car crushers

Car crushing machine 

One of the first car crushing machines was invented by Allen B. Sharp and Richard A. Hull, both assignors to Al-Jon Incorporated located in Ottumwa, Iowa. The patent for the machine was filed on March 22, 1965, and patented on August 16, 1966. This United States Patent was primarily examined by Walter A. Scheel. 

The reason they came up with this invention is because scrap cars were too big and bulky to transport to the sites that turned them into reusable material, and the cost to transport them was uneconomical because, at times, it would cost more to send it than the car was worth, because transportation costs were determined by weight. Since uncrushed cars were less dense and took up more space, even for a short haul, the scrap cars were worth less than it cost to deliver them. 

Before then, car crushing methods consisted of dropping heavy weights on cars, which was time-consuming, sometimes costly, and produced inconsistent scrap sizes. With this car crushing machine, a car is fed through a hydraulically powered jaw and is slowly flattened as it goes through, similar to how a pasta machine flattens pasta dough. The car scraps are flattened into dimensions of six inches tall by five to six feet wide, similar to the length of its original size. The design of this machine is meant to be portable so it can move to anywhere cars have been gathered by being within the legal size of highway transport. The machine can be operated by a single person.

Mobile car crusher 

The mobile car crusher was invented by Charlie Roy Hall in the city of Wadley, Georgia in the year 1996 and was patented on August 12, 1997. The primary examiner of this United States patent was Stephen F. Gerrity. As a condensed version of a standard car crusher, a mobile car crusher has a smaller opening with lower output, so it can crush only smaller sized, C-class cars. This machine is mobile as a result of its dual functions: a travel mode for highways, which is when the hydraulic cylinder guiding posts are lowered, and a working mode, when the hydraulic cylinder guiding posts are raised. There are two guiding posts on either side of the machine, with hydraulic cylinders inside of them. The guiding posts protect the hydraulic cylinders from external interference. The hydraulic cylinders are what is used to apply pressure to the car, with a crusher hood to spread the pressure evenly and crush the entirety of the car. A heavy-duty lowboy trailer is attached to the bottom of the mobile car crusher and can be transported only using a semi-trailer truck. Due to the increase in car production, scrap metal became high in demand, so the mobile car crusher was made to increase efficiency of gathering scrap metal. Lifespans of cars were also decreasing, so the number of cars being sent to large centralized car crushing facilities rose. Consequently, facilities needed to outsource to mobile car crushers so they could keep up with the increased volume of automobiles.

Baling Press 

Baling presses are used for the compaction of general scrap material, but are popularly used for automobile bodyshells.  They generally consist of two hydraulically powered hinged "wings", which literally fold the vehicle shell in half, and then crush it into a rectangular "log".  Once the wings are fully closed, pusher plates, again powered by hydraulics, squeeze the log along its axis from one or both ends until a dense cube or "bale" is formed, which is then either ejected from a door at the end of the machine or removed by a crane.  Some baling presses have a guillotine shear which chops the bale or log into smaller pieces.  Baling presses, like mobile car crushers, can be mounted on a semi-trailer so that it can be transported between automobile recycling yards.

Car crushers in popular culture 

Car crushers have been popular in films as devices of murder or humour. They have appeared in such well known films as Goldfinger (destroying a Lincoln Continental with a body inside), Cleopatra Jones, National Lampoon's Vacation, I'll Never Forget What's'isname, Kick-Ass, Superman III, Gone in 60 Seconds, Pulp Fiction, Strul, Mickey One, and many others.

They have also appeared in several television shows including Mathnet's "The Case of the Great Car Robbery". Joe Howard's character, George Frankly hid in a to-be-stolen car, and the other characters thought he was still in the car after it was flattened by the crusher.

A car crusher was used to dispose of Walt and Jesse's RV containing a mobile meth lab in season three of Breaking Bad. 

A car crusher appeared in the junkyard scene of the Kushner-Locke/Disney film The Brave Little Toaster.

A car crusher appeared in the San Francisco junkyard also Known as: Wrecking yard in the scene so when Sasha stops a junkyard car crusher from crushing the one Charlie is stuck in during the episode "Miss Guidance." All Dogs Go to Heaven: The Series 

A car crusher also appears in the video games Grand Theft Auto 2 where it generates power-ups depending on car model and is also used in an assassination mission. It also appears in Grand Theft Auto III, Grand Theft Auto: Liberty City Stories and Mafia II where the player can make money from stealing cars and taking them to the crusher.

A car crusher also featured in Need for Speed: The Run. Jack is seen tied to the steering wheel of his red Porsche Carrera 911, on a crusher in a junkyard, before Janella Salvador/Habib Diator's death. On the ground, Marcus Blackwell and a mobster are watching. He is about to be crushed to death, but he wakes up and manages to untie himself and escape the crusher at the last second. He sneaks out and steals an NFS Edition Audi RS4, barely escaping the junkyard alive. Soon, he is chased by multiple Porsche Cayennes, but Jack escapes.

See also 

 Beat the Crusher, a UK TV show featuring cars demolished by a car crusher
 César Baldaccini, a baled car artist, now deceased 
 James Squillante, a mobster reputedly crushed in his own car
 Scrap metal shredder
 Vehicle recycling

References

External links 

 "Where Old Cars Meet Their End And Start Over", November 1930, Popular Science bottom of page 61 shows the first type car crusher in action
 "Giant Press Bales Autos." Popular Science, August 1948, p.119.
 Car Crushing Machine Patent
 Mobile Car Crusher Patent

Vehicle recycling